The Homeless Children (Turkish: Köprüaltı Çocukları) is a 1953 Turkish drama film directed by Renan Fosforoğlu.

Cast
 Güner Çelme  
 Renan Fosforoğlu 
 Fikret Hakan 
 Vahi Öz 
 Yıldız Erdem 
 Halit Akçatepe
 Sıtkı Akçatepe 
 Kemal Emin Bara 
 Belkis Dilligil 
 Mürüvet Sim 
 Mualla Sürer 
 İnci Tamay 
 Feridun Çölgeçen

References

Bibliography
 Türker İnanoğlu. 5555 afişle Türk Sineması. Kabalcı, 2004.

External links
 

1953 films
1953 drama films
1950s Turkish-language films
Turkish drama films
Turkish black-and-white films